32 Squadron  was a short lived coastal patrol squadron of the South African Air Force during the Second World War.  It was founded in December 1939 and assumed the responsibility for coastal patrols and anti-submarine escorts for shipping.  The squadron never had many aircraft (highest total was seven Ju-86  and four Avro Ansons) and remained a small unit for the full duration of its short existence.  It was disbanded in August 1940 when its Ju-86 aircraft were sent to Johannesburg to augment 12 Squadron who were deployed in East Africa.

Aircraft

References

Squadrons of the South African Air Force
Military units and formations established in 1939
Military units and formations disestablished in 1940